The Distinguished Scholarly Book Award is presented annually by the American Sociological Association (ASA) in recognition of an ASA member's outstanding book published within two years prior to the award year.

About 
In 1956, the ASA presented its first annual book award, the MacIver Award. Since then, this award has gone through a number of changes, and is now known as the Distinguished Scholarly Book Award.

As it is currently named, the Distinguished Scholarly Book Award of the ASA was first given in 1986, and is presented at the ASA Annual Meeting every August. It is an ASA Major Award, given at association-level, in contrast to the various section-level ASA awards.

Nominations for the award are made by members of the ASA. The Distinguished Scholarly Book Award selection committee, member terms of which last a duration of two years, chooses award recipients.

List of Recipients 
2020 - Tey Meadow, Trans Kids: Being Gendered in the Twenty-First Century
2020 - Hector Carrillo, Pathways of Desire: The Sexual Migration of Mexican Gay Men Honorable Mention: Anju Mary Paul Multinational Maids: Stepwise Migration in a Global Labor Market 
2019 - Nicole Gonzalez Van Cleve, Crook County: Racism and Injustice in America's Largest Criminal Court (Stanford University Press, 2016)
2018 - Lauren B. Edelman, Working Law: Courts, Corporations, and Symbolic Civil Rights (University of Chicago Press, 2016)
2017 - David Cook-Martin and David Scott FitzGerald, Culling the Masses: The Democratic Origins of Racial Immigration Policy in the Americas (Harvard University Press, 2014).
2016 - Sanyu A. Mojola, Love, Money and HIV: Becoming a Modern African Woman in the Age of AIDS (University of California Press, 2014).
2015 - Elizabeth A. Armstrong and Laura T. Hamilton, Paying for the Party: How College Maintains Inequality (Harvard University Press, 2013).
2014 -  Monica Prasad, The Land of Too Much: American Abundance and the Paradox of Poverty (Harvard University Press, 2012) 
2014 - Robert J. Sampson,  Great American City: Chicago and the Enduring Neighborhood Effect (University of Chicago Press, 2012). Honorable Mention: Claudio E. Benzecray, The Opera Fanatic: Ethnography of an Obsession (University of Chicago Press, 2011).
2013 - Greta R. Krippner, Capitalizing on Crisis: the Political Origins of the Rise of Finance (Harvard University Press, 2012). Honorable Mention: David W. Garland, Peculiar Institution: America's Death Penalty in an Age of Abolition (Belknap Press of Harvard University Press, reprint ed., 2012).
2012 - Frank Dobbin, Investing in Equal Opportunity (Princeton University Press, 2011); and Chandra Mukerji, Impossible Engineering: Technology and Territoriality on the Canal du Midi (Princeton Studies in Cultural Sociology) (Princeton University Press, 2009).
2011 - Randall Collins, Violence: A Micro-sociological Theory (Princeton University Press, 2009); and Marion Fourcade, Economists and Societies: Discipline and Profession in the United States, Britain and France, 1890s to 1990s (Princeton University Press, 2010).
2010 - Philip Kasinitz, John H. Mollenkopf, Mary C. Waters, and Jennifer Holdaway, Inheriting the City: The Children of Immigrants Come of Age (Russell Sage Foundation, 2008).
2009 - Steven Epstein, Inclusion: The Politics of Difference in Medical Research (University of Chicago Press, 2007).
2008 - Robert Courtney Smith, Mexican New York: Transnational Lives of New Immigrants (University of California Press, 2006).
2007 - Patricia Hill Collins, Black Sexual Politics: African Americans, Gender and the New Racism (Routledge, 2005); and Jerome Karabel, The Chosen: The Hidden History of Admission and Exclusion at Harvard, Yale, and Princeton (Houghton Mifflin, 2005).
2006 - Edward Telles, Race in Another America:The Significance of Skin Color in Brazil (Princeton University Press, 2004). Honorable Mention: Vivek Chibber, Locked in Place: State-Building and Late Industrialization in India (Princeton University Press, 2003).
2005 - Beverly J. Silver, Forces of Labor: Workers' Movements and Globalization since 1870 (Cambridge University Press, 2003).
2004 - Mounira M. Charrad, States and Women’s Rights: The Making of Postcolonial Tunisia, Algeria, and Morocco (University of California Press, 2001).
2003 - Richard Lachmann, Capitalists in Spite of Themselves: Elite Conflict and Economic Transitions in Early Modern Europe (Oxford University Press, 2000).
2002 - Alejandro Portes and Rubén G. Rumbaut, Legacies: The Story of the Immigrant Second Generation (University of California Press and Russell Sage Foundation, 2001).
2001 - Robert L. Nelson and William P. Bridges Legalizing Gender Inequality: Courts, Markets, and Unequal Pay for Women in America (Cambridge University Press, 1999).
2000 - Charles Tilly, Durable Inequality (University of California Press, 1998).
1999 - Randall Collins, The Sociology of Philosophies: A Global Theory of Intellectual Change (Belknap Press of Harvard University Press, 1998).
1998 - John Markoff, Abolition of Feudalism: Peasants, Lords and Legislators in the French Revolution (Pennsylvania State University Press, 1996). Honorable Mentions: Kathryn Edin and Laura Lein, Making Ends Meet (Russell Sage Foundation, 1997); Sharon Hays, The Cultural Contradictions of Motherhood (Yale University Press, 1996); and Erik Olin Wright, Class Counts (Cambridge University Press, 1997).
1997 - Thomas M. Shapiro and Melvin L. Oliver, Black Wealth/White Wealth: A New Perspective on Racial Inequality (Routledge, 1995). Honorable Mention: Diane Vaughan, The Challenger Launch Decision: Risky Technology, Culture, and Deviance at NASA (University of Chicago Press, 1996).
1996 - Murray Milner, Jr., Status and Sacredness: A General Theory of Status Relations and an Analysis of Indian Culture (Oxford University Press, 1994).
1995 - Douglas S. Massey and Nancy A. Denton, American Apartheid: Segregation and the Making of the Underclass (Harvard University Press, 1993); and James B. McKee, Sociology and the Race Problem (University of Illinois Press, 1993).
1994 - Mitchell Duneier, Slim's Table (University of Chicago Press, 1992).
1993 - Jack Goldstone, Revolution and Rebellion in the Early Modern World (University of California Press, 1990).
1992 - James S. Coleman, Foundations of Social Theory (Harvard University Press, 1990).
1991 - Andrew Abbott, The System of Professions: An Essay on the Division of Expert Labor (University of Chicago Press, 1988).
1990 - John R. Logan and Harvey L. Molotch, Urban Fortunes: The Political Economy of Place (University of California Press, 1987). Special Recognition: Kim Scheppele, Legal Secrets: Equality and Efficiency in the Common Law (University of Chicago Press, 1988).
1989 - Charles Tilly, The Contentious French (Harvard University Press, 1986).
1988 - Michael Mann, The Sources of Social Power, Volume 1 (Cambridge University Press, 1986).
1987 - Andrew G. Walder, Communist Neo-Traditionalism: Work and Authority in Chinese Industry (University of California Press, 1986).
1986 - Aldon D. Morris, Origins of the Civil Rights Movement: Black Communities Organizing for Change (Free Press, 1984); and Lenore J. Weitzman, The Divorce Revolution: The Unexpected Social and Economic Consequences for Women and Children in American (Free Press, 1985).

See also

 List of social sciences awards

References

External links
 Distinguished Scholarly Book ASA Award

Sociology awards
Social sciences awards
American Sociological Association